The 2011–12 Macedonian Second Football League was the 20th season since its establishment. It began on 7 August 2011 and ended on 27 May 2012.

Participating teams 

1 Makedonija GP was in the first part of season participated as Treska.

League table

Results 
Every team will play each other team twice (home and away) for a total of 30 matches each.

Promotion playoff

See also
2011–12 Macedonian Football Cup
2011–12 Macedonian First Football League
2011–12 Macedonian Third Football League

References

External links
Football Federation of Macedonia 
MacedonianFootball.com 

Macedonia 2
2
Macedonian Second Football League seasons